Cameroon are one of Africa's major forces in the Africa Cup of Nations. Cameroon won its first tournament in 1984, Cameroon emerged and became a fearsome power of the tournament, winning the tournament again in 2000 and 2002.

The 2017 tournament was the last tournament to date Camerooon has won.

References

External links
Africa Cup of Nations – Archives competitions – cafonline.com

Cameroon national football team